Highway 375, also known as the Hepburn Access Road, is an unsigned highway in the Canadian province of Saskatchewan. It runs from Highway 12 to the town of Hepburn.

References

375